Pocock Rowing  may refer to:

Pocock Racing Shells, a Seattle-based racing shells manufacturer
Pocock Rowing Center, an amateur rowing club located in Seattle
The George Pocock Rowing Foundation, a 501(c)(3) non-profit organization located in Seattle